Elon  (Hebrew:  ʼĒlōn, "oak")  was a judge of the Biblical era.

Biography
Elon appears in the Book of Judges 12:11–12. He was a member of the Tribe of Zebulun who served as a judge of Israel for ten years. He was preceded by Ibzan and succeeded by Abdon.  Elon, along with Tola, Yair, Ibzan, and Abdon are only briefly mentioned and may be the names of clans.

Elon is translated as "Ahialon" in the Douay–Rheims Bible and other translations.

Little is known about Elon's role as a judge and whether the Israelites were at war or peace during his tenure. According to some scholars, he was a wise and fair judge, although his name is not linked to any historical exploits.

See also
Shophet

References

Judges of ancient Israel